Amund Wichne (born 12 May 1997) is a Norwegian footballer who plays as a goalkeeper for Haugesund.

Career
Wichne signed for Viking in the summer of 2014. In 2016, he was loaned out to Åsane where he would play 4 matches before returning to his parent club. He made his league debut for Viking against Molde on 17 September 2017.

Wichne moved to Start in 2020. On 1 March 2022, he terminated his contract with the club. The next day, he signed for Jerv.

In January 2023, he signed for Haugesund on a two-year contract.

Personal life
He was born at Rikshospitalet as a part of quadruplets, all boys. They grew up in Mandal. His brothers Eirik and Torje also became footballers.

Career statistics

Honours
 Viking
 1. divisjon: 2018
 Norwegian Football Cup: 2019

References

1997 births
Living people
People from Mandal, Norway
Sportspeople from Agder
Norwegian footballers
Eliteserien players
Norwegian First Division players
Mandalskameratene players
Viking FK players
Åsane Fotball players
IK Start players
FK Jerv players
FK Haugesund players
Association football goalkeepers
Norway youth international footballers
Twin sportspeople
Norwegian twins
Quadruplets